Misato may refer to:

Places
Misato, Akita, a town in Akita Prefecture
Misato, Gunma, a town in Gunma Prefecture
Misato, Kumamoto, a town in Kumamoto Prefecture
Misato, Mie, a village in Mie Prefecture
Misato, Miyagi, a town in Miyagi Prefecture
Misato, Miyazaki, a town in Miyazaki Prefecture
Misato, Nagano, a village in Nagano Prefecture
Misato, Saitama (City), a city in Saitama Prefecture
Misato, Saitama (Town), a town in Saitama Prefecture
Misato, Shimane, a town in Shimane Prefecture
Misato, Tokushima, a village in Tokushima Prefecture
Misato, Wakayama, a town in Wakayama Prefecture

Other uses
Misato (given name), a feminine Japanese given name
Misato (surname), a Japanese surname